Erdon Daci (born 4 July 1998) is a Macedonian professional footballer who plays as a forward for Belgian First Division A club Westerlo.

Club career
On 22 July 2019, Daci signed a professional contract with Konyaspor for 3 years. Daci made his professional debut for Konyaspor in a 0–0 Süper Lig tie with Ankaragücü on 18 August 2019.

On 30 August 2021, Daci signed a three-year contract with Westerlo in Belgium.

International career
Daci was born in Macedonia and is of Albanian descent. He represented the North Macedonia U21s internationally.

Honours 
Westerlo

 Belgian First Division B: 2021–22

References

External links
 
 

1998 births
Living people
Footballers from Skopje
Albanian footballers from North Macedonia
Association football forwards
Macedonian footballers
North Macedonia youth international footballers
Konyaspor footballers
K.V.C. Westerlo players
Süper Lig players
Challenger Pro League players
Macedonian expatriate footballers
Expatriate footballers in Turkey
Macedonian expatriate sportspeople in Turkey
Expatriate footballers in Belgium
Macedonian expatriate sportspeople in Belgium